Kamil Bury (born 23 July 1995) is a Polish cross-country skier. He competed in the 2018 Winter Olympics.

His brother Dominik is also a skier.

Cross-country skiing results
All results are sourced from the International Ski Federation (FIS).

Olympic Games

Distance reduced to 30 km due to weather conditions.

World Championships

World Cup

Season standings

References

1995 births
Living people
Cross-country skiers at the 2018 Winter Olympics
Cross-country skiers at the 2022 Winter Olympics
Polish male cross-country skiers
Tour de Ski skiers
Olympic cross-country skiers of Poland
People from Cieszyn